Shuko Aoyama and Gabriela Dabrowski were the defending champions, but Dabrowski chose to participate in  Stanford instead. Aoyama played alongside Eri Hozumi, but lost in the quarterfinals to Lara Arruabarrena and Andreja Klepač who eventually lost in the final to Belinda Bencic and Kristina Mladenovic with the score 7–5, 7–6(9–7).

Seeds

Draw

Draw

References
Draw

Citi Open - Women's Doubles